, there were about 500 electric vehicles in Wyoming.

Charging stations
, there were 58 public charging stations in Wyoming.

The Infrastructure Investment and Jobs Act, signed into law in November 2021, allocates  to charging stations in Wyoming.

, the state and federal governments recognize I-25, I-80, and I-90 as potential charging corridors.

By region

Casper
, there were 34 electric vehicles registered in Natrona County.

Cheyenne
, there were 106 electric vehicles registered in Laramie County.

References

Wyoming
Road transportation in Wyoming